Prince Ageel bin Muhammad al-Badr Hamidaddin (Arabic: عقيل بن محمد البدر حميد الدين) (born London in 1973) is the eldest son of Muhammad al-Badr, the last ruling king of the Yemen.

Biography 
Yemen became a republic following the overthrow of the monarchy in 1962. Since the death of his father in 1996, Ageel bin Muhammad has been the head of the royal Hamid ad-Din lineage.  He uses the title Saif al-Islam ("Sword of Islam"), which was formerly carried by the Crown Princes of Yemen.

Ageel bin Muhammed has two sons: Muhammad Al-Hassan bin 'Ageel Hamidaddin and Ahmed bin ‘Ageel Al-Badr.

Ancestry

See also
2014–15 Yemeni coup d'état

References

 

1973 births
Living people
Heirs apparent who never acceded
Middle Eastern royalty
Rassid dynasty
Pretenders
Sons of kings